Callimetopus degeneratus is a species of beetle in the family Cerambycidae. It was described by Heller in 1924, originally under the genus Niphonoclea. It is known from the Philippines.

References

Callimetopus
Beetles described in 1924